André Domingos da Silva (born 26 November 1972 in Santo André, São Paulo) is a Brazilian athlete who competed mainly in the 100 and 200 metres.

He competed for Brazil in the 1996 Summer Olympics held in Atlanta, United States in the 4 x 100 metre relay where he won the bronze medal with his teammates Arnaldo da Silva, Robson da Silva and Edson Ribeiro.

In the 2000 Summer Olympics held in Sydney, Australia he was again part of the Brazilian 4 x 100 metre team with Edson Ribeiro and newcomers Vicente de Lima and Claudinei da Silva and this time the team won the silver medal.

da Silva competed in 4 consecutive Olympics, in the 100 metres in Barcelona, 1992; the 100 metres and relay in Atlanta, 1996; the 200 metres and relay in Sydney, 2000; and the 100 metres and relay in Athens, 2004.

He was a part of the gold medal winning 4x100 relay at the 1999 Pan Am Games as well as the Universiade winner in the individual 100 metres that same year.

His personal best times are 10.06 seconds over 100 m and 20.15 seconds over 200 m.

References

External links

1972 births
Living people
Brazilian male sprinters
Olympic silver medalists for Brazil
Olympic bronze medalists for Brazil
Athletes (track and field) at the 1992 Summer Olympics
Athletes (track and field) at the 1996 Summer Olympics
Athletes (track and field) at the 2000 Summer Olympics
Athletes (track and field) at the 2004 Summer Olympics
Athletes (track and field) at the 1995 Pan American Games
Athletes (track and field) at the 1999 Pan American Games
Athletes (track and field) at the 2003 Pan American Games
Olympic athletes of Brazil
Sportspeople from São Paulo (state)
Pan American Games athletes for Brazil
World Athletics Championships medalists
Medalists at the 2000 Summer Olympics
Medalists at the 1996 Summer Olympics
Pan American Games bronze medalists for Brazil
Olympic silver medalists in athletics (track and field)
Olympic bronze medalists in athletics (track and field)
Pan American Games medalists in athletics (track and field)
Universiade medalists in athletics (track and field)
Universiade gold medalists for Brazil
Medalists at the 1999 Summer Universiade
Medalists at the 1995 Pan American Games
Medalists at the 1999 Pan American Games
Medalists at the 2003 Pan American Games
20th-century Brazilian people
21st-century Brazilian people